"Will You Be There (In the Morning)" is a song by American rock band Heart. The ballad was written by veteran songwriter and producer Robert John "Mutt" Lange, who was responsible for writing Heart's US number-two single "All I Wanna Do Is Make Love to You" in 1990, and was released as the first single from the band's 11th studio album, Desire Walks On (although "Black on Black II" was released to radio first). Unlike the majority of Heart songs, which feature Ann Wilson on lead vocals, the lead singer on the song is Nancy Wilson. The song was released in the United Kingdom in November 1993 and was released in the United States the following month.

"Will You Be There" peaked at number 39 on the US Billboard Hot 100; it became the last song by Heart to enter the US top 40. Despite this, it was a top-20 Adult Contemporary success. Together with "You're the Voice", it is Heart's only song to perform better in the United Kingdom than the US, rising to number 19 on the UK Singles Chart. In Canada, the song reached number eight, giving Heart their eighth and final top-10 single, but it was not their last top-40 hit there. It additionally charted within the top 40 in Australia, Iceland, and New Zealand.

Track listings

US cassette single and European CD single
 "Will You Be There (In the Morning)" – 4:27
 "Risin' Suspicion" – 3:04

UK 7-inch picture disc and cassette single
 "Will You Be There (In the Morning)"
 "These Dreams" (live)

UK CD1
 "Will You Be There (In the Morning)" – 4:27
 "What About Love" – 3:41
 "Risin' Suspicion" – 3:04
 "Who Will You Run To" – 4:01

UK CD2
 "Will You Be There (In the Morning)" – 4:27
 "Love Hurts" – 4:34
 "These Dreams" (live) – 4:22
 "All I Wanna Do Is Make Love to You" – 4:29

Australian CD single
 "Will You Be There (In the Morning)"
 "Risin' Suspicion"
 "Love Hurts"
 "These Dreams"

Charts

Weekly charts

Year-end charts

Release history

References

1990s ballads
1993 singles
1993 songs
Capitol Records singles
Heart (band) songs
Rock ballads
Songs written by Robert John "Mutt" Lange